Tygodnik Angora, commonly known as Angora, is a Polish language weekly press review published in  Łódź. The magazine was established in 1990. It is distributed in Warsaw, Dortmund, Chicago, Toronto and New York. In addition, the weekly also covers editorial columns. The magazine is published by Wydawnictwo Westa Druk Mirosław Kuliś.

In 2010 the circulation of Tygodnik Angora was 469,675 copies.

See also
 List of magazines in Poland

References

External links
 Official website

1990 establishments in Poland
Magazines about the media
Magazines established in 1990
Mass media in Łódź
Polish-language magazines
News magazines published in Poland
Polish news websites
Weekly magazines published in Poland